Phoma exigua (syn. Ascochyta gossypii) is a fungal plant pathogen. It causes wet weather blight in cotton and it can be treated with systemic copper.

Varieties of Phoma exigua 
 Phoma exigua var. exigua
 Phoma exigua var. foveata
 Phoma exigua var. heteromorpha
 Phoma exigua var. linicola
 Phoma exigua var. solanicola

References

External links 
 Index Fungorum
 USDA ARS Fungal Database

Fungal plant pathogens and diseases
Cotton diseases
exigua
Fungi described in 1847